Pomerantsev is a surname with female form Pomerantseva. Notable people with the surname include:

Alexander Pomerantsev (1849—1918), Russian architect
Boris Ivanovich Pomerantsev (1903-1939), Russian acarologist
Peter Pomerantsev (born 1977), Soviet-born British journalist, author and TV producer
Erna Pomérantseva (1899-1908), Russian folklorist

Fictional characters
Anna Pomerantseva is a  character in US TV series Homeland

Russian-language surnames